Ramprasad Ki Tehrvi  is a 2019 Indian Hindi-language family drama film directed by Seema Pahwa and produced by Jio Studios and Drishyam Films. It features an ensemble cast of Naseeruddin Shah, Vikrant Massey, Konkona Sen Sharma, Parambrata Chatterjee, Vinay Pathak, Supriya Pathak, Manoj Pahwa, and Vineet Kumar. The film also marks the directorial debut for actress Seema Pahwa,  who also wrote the film, based on her own play, Pind Daan.

The film premiered at the Mumbai Film Festival on 17 October 2019. It was released theatrically on 1 January 2021. The movie received critical acclaim from the critics who praised the story, screenplay, performances, themes and the family dynamic at play.

Synopsis
Ramprasad's entire family gathers at their ancestral home in Lucknow  for 13 days after his  death, to perform and observe the Hindu traditions and death rituals called the tehrvi. During the course, the family’s dynamics, politics, and insecurities come out, and then they realise that the importance of people and things are only evident in retrospect.

Cast
Naseeruddin Shah as Ramprasad Bhargava (Bauji)
Supriya Pathak as Amma (Ramprasad's wife)
 Sanah Kapur as Young Amma
Konkona Sen Sharma as Seema (Nishant's wife)
Parambrata Chattopadhyay as Nishant aka Neetu (Ramprasad's youngest son)/ Young Ramprasad
Vikrant Massey as Rahul (Gajraj's son)
Manoj Pahwa as Gajraj (Ramprasad's eldest son)
Ninad Kamat as Manoj (Ramprasad's second son)
Vinay Pathak as Pankaj (Ramprasad's third son)

Deepika Amin as Sushma (Gajraj's wife)
Divya Jagdale as Sulekha (Manoj's wife)
Sadiya Siddiqui as Pratibha (Pankaj's wife)
Anubha Fatehpura as Rani (Ramprasad's elder daughter)
Sarika Singh as Dhaani (Ramprasad's younger daughter)

Brijendra Kala as Prakash (Rani's husband)
Shrikant Verma as Basant (Dhaani's husband)
Rajendra Gupta as Tauji (Ramprasad's elder brother)
Pushpa Joshi as Bua Ji (Ramprasad's elder sister)
Vineet Kumar as Mamaji (Amma's brother)
Alka Kaushal as  Sheila (neighbour)
Manukriti Pahwa as Bitto (Sheila's daughter)
Sawan Tank as Samay (Manoj's son)
Neivan Ahuja as Saksham 
Yamini Das as Mamiji
Mahesh Sharma as Vinod (Tauji's son, who also drives him around)

Release
The film was premiered at Mumbai Film Festival in Mumbai on 17 October 2019.

The film was released theatrically on 1 January 2021.

Soundtrack 

The film's soundtrack was composed by Sagar Desai while lyrics written by Neeraj Pandey.

Awards and nominations

References

External links

Ramprasad Ki Tehrvi on Bollywood Hungama
Hindi-language drama films
2019 directorial debut films
2019 films
2010s Hindi-language films
Indian drama films
Films about death
Films set in Lucknow
2019 drama films
Films about dysfunctional families
Indian films based on plays